Ataúlfo Sánchez Matulic (16 March 1934 – 3 February 2015) was an Argentine professional football player and coach.

Career
Born in Zárate, Buenos Aires, Sánchez played as a goalkeeper for Racing, América and the San Diego Toros.

References

1934 births
2015 deaths
Argentine footballers
Racing Club de Avellaneda footballers
Club América footballers
San Diego Toros players
North American Soccer League (1968–1984) players
Association football goalkeepers
Argentine football managers
Argentine expatriate footballers
Argentine expatriate sportspeople in Mexico
Expatriate footballers in Mexico
Argentine expatriate sportspeople in the United States
Expatriate soccer players in the United States
People from Zárate, Buenos Aires
Sportspeople from Buenos Aires Province